The Movement of Progressive Democrats (MDP) was a political party in Burkina Faso.

History
The MDP was established on 15 October 1987 by Hermann Yaméogo. It joined the Popular Front, but was suspended from the group in July 1990 following internal problems. In December 1990 Yaméogo broke away from the party to establish the Alliance for Democracy and Federation.

The party won a single seat in the 1992 parliamentary elections. In 1996 it merged into the new Congress for Democracy and Progress.

References

Defunct political parties in Burkina Faso
Political parties established in 1987
Political parties disestablished in 1996
1987 establishments in Burkina Faso
1996 disestablishments in Burkina Faso